Chaudhry Muhammad Ashraf Deona is a Pakistani politician who was a Member of the Provincial Assembly of the Punjab, from May 2013 to May 2018.

Early life and education
He was born on 6 May 1946 in Gujrat District.

He graduated in 2009 from University of the Punjab and has a degree of Bachelor of Arts.

Political career

He was elected to the Provincial Assembly of the Punjab as a candidate of Pakistan Muslim League (N) (PML-N) from Constituency PP-112 (Gujrat-V) in 2013 Pakistani general election.

In May 2018, he quit PML-N and joined Pakistan Tehreek-e-Insaf (PTI).

References

Living people
1946 births
Punjab MPAs 2013–2018
Pakistan Muslim League (N) MPAs (Punjab)
University of the Punjab alumni
People from Gujrat, Pakistan